Alexander Juel Andersen (born 29 January 1991) is a Danish footballer, who plays as a full-back for Odense Boldklub

Club career

Viborg FF
Andersen is born and raised in Viborg. He started playing at a local club, Bruunshåb-Tapdrup IF, where he played some years before the trip went on to FK Viborg. Already at the age of 16, he went on a trial at AS Monaco. He was promoted to the first team squad in August 2008 at the age of 17.

His professional career accelerated when he became the fourth youngest player in 2007 to debut in the Danish Superliga. This happened, when he came on the pitch in a Danish Superliga match between Viborg FF and Randers FC at the age of only 16 years. He was nominated as the player of the year by the fans for the 2008/09 season. Andersen started out as a midfielder in his youth career, but was retrained as a defender.

He continued to develop and spent another three years at the club, after extending his contract with the club until 2011. Although he got a good portion of time on the pitch, it wasn’t enough for him in the last, so he was loaned out to Randers FC.

Loan to Randers FC
Andersen was loaned out to Randers FC in January 2011 until the summer 2011. In Randers, Andersen didn’t play a single match due to a lot of injuries. He was operated for an injury in his groin in March 2011.

AC Horsens
AC Horsens signed Andersen already in January 2011, but the transfer would first be valid from the summer 2011, when his contract with Viborg FF expired. He was initially not bought into the starting lineup, but he quickly changed it and quickly became a regular part of Johnny Mølby's squad.

When AC Horsens was relegated to the Danish 1st Division back in 2013, many clubs were interested in the right back, but AGF pulled the longest straw when they presented the player to a 4-year contract with expiry in July 2017.

AGF
Andersen was official signed on 11 July 2013 by AGF on a 4-year contract.

In AGF Alexander Juel Andersen was conceived as a role on the right back, but slowly he was retrained and was most used in the central defense, becoming one of the club's favorites under Peter Sørensen, while referring more to the bench when Morten Wieghorst took over the coach seat. Andersen also revealed that coach Wieghorst wanted to play him on the midfield.

Vendsyssel FF
Andersen joined Vendsyssel FF in the summer 2018 and soon became the captain.

OB
On 2 September 2019, however, he was loaned out to Odense Boldklub for the rest of 2019. After returning til Vendsyssel at the end of the loan spell, Andersen said to the medias, that he was hoping to stay at OB. His wish came true on 8 January 2020, when OB announced, that they had signed the player permanently on a 2,5-year contract.

On 31 March 2022, Juel Andersen joined Norwegian club Aalesund on a loan deal until the end of June 2022. At the same time, OB announced that the player had extended his contract with the club until the end of 2022.

Private life
Alexander Juel Andersen is the little brother of Lars Emil Juel Andersen, who also is a footballer.

References

External links
 
 Alexander J. Andersen on DBU
 Official Danish Superliga stats

1991 births
Living people
Danish men's footballers
Danish expatriate men's footballers
Denmark youth international footballers
Denmark under-21 international footballers
Association football defenders
People from Viborg Municipality
Viborg FF players
AC Horsens players
Aarhus Gymnastikforening players
Vendsyssel FF players
Odense Boldklub players
Aalesunds FK players
Danish Superliga players
Danish 1st Division players
Eliteserien players
Danish expatriate sportspeople in Norway
Expatriate footballers in Norway
Sportspeople from the Central Denmark Region